Joan Canning, 1st Viscountess Canning (née Scott; 1776 – 14 March 1837) was the wife of British prime minister George Canning.

She was born in Scotland, the daughter of Major-General John Scott and Margaret Dundas. Her sisters were the Duchess of Portland and the Countess of Moray.

On 8 July 1800, she married George Canning in St George's, Hanover Square on Hanover Square, London, with John Hookham Frere and William Pitt the Younger as witnesses. They had four children:

George Charles Canning (1801–1820), died from consumption
William Pitt Canning (1802–1828), died from drowning in Madeira, Portugal
Harriet Canning (1804–1876), married Ulick John de Burgh, 1st Marquess of Clanricarde
Charles Canning (later 2nd Viscount Canning and 1st Earl Canning) (1812–1862)

On 22 January 1828, nearly six months after the death of her husband, Joan was created 1st Viscountess Canning of Kilbraham, with a special remainder to the heirs male of her late husband. She lived with her youngest son in the family's London home in Grosvenor Square.

Arms

References

1776 births
1837 deaths
British viscountesses
Spouses of prime ministers of the United Kingdom
Viscounts in the Peerage of the United Kingdom
Hereditary peeresses created by George IV